This was a new event on the ITF Women's Circuit.

Seeds

Main draw

Finals

Top half

Bottom half

References 
 Main draw

Ando Securities Open - Singles
Ando Securities Open